Keith Greenfield (born 6 December 1968) is the current Director of Cricket for Sussex County Cricket Club. 

Greenfield is a former English first-class cricketer, whose career for Sussex spanned twelve years between 1987 until 1999. He played 78 first-class and 160 one-day matches for the county, scoring over 7,000 runs in total. 

A right-handed batsman, he was also an occasional right-arm medium bowler who picked up thirty-two wickets. 

He joined Sussex initially as part of a Youth Opportunities Scheme, progressing through the Second XI team and development squads until he was given a chance in the First XI. His career best, 154, came against Glamorgan. 

After his playing career ended he joined the administrative staff as Director of the Sussex Academy, being awarded a testimonial in 2004, followed by a promotion to Cricket Performance Manager in 2005. 

He also continued to play club cricket in Brighton, where he was born, and Hove.

References

External links
 
 

1968 births
Living people 
Sportspeople from Brighton
Directors of Cricket 
English cricketers 
English cricketers of 1969 to 2000
Sussex cricketers